"Lovers Who Wander" is a popular song written by Dion DiMucci and Ernie Maresca. Recorded by Dion and released as a single in 1962, it reached No. 3 on the US Billboard Hot 100 chart.

References

1962 songs
1962 singles
Dion DiMucci songs
Songs written by Ernie Maresca
Songs written by Dion DiMucci
Laurie Records singles